Broad Bay Manor in Virginia Beach is a historic manor house which is purportedly the oldest extant European-built house in the southeastern United States.
Thomas Allen built the small center portion of the current larger house in circa 1640 of Flemish bond brick on land granted to him by Governor Thomas West, 3rd Baron De La Warr or his brother John West. It is still a private residence and is located in the Broad Bay Colony part of northeastern Virginia Beach

References

See also
List of the oldest buildings in Virginia

Houses in Virginia
History of Virginia Beach, Virginia